Hercules Simmons (born 1840s), sometimes spelled Simons was a state legislator in South Carolina during the Reconstruction era. He represented Colleton County.

References

People from Colleton County, South Carolina
Members of the South Carolina House of Representatives
Reconstruction Era
1840s births
African-American politicians during the Reconstruction Era